The 2021 Internazionali Femminili di Palermo was a professional women's tennis tournament played on outdoor clay courts at the Country Time Club. It was the 29th edition of the tournament and part of the 2021 WTA Tour. It took place in Palermo, Italy between 19 and 25 July 2021. First-seeded Danielle Collins won the singles title.

Finals

Singles 

  Danielle Collins defeated  Elena-Gabriela Ruse, 6–4, 6–2.

Doubles 

  Erin Routliffe /  Kimberley Zimmermann defeated  Natela Dzalamidze /  Kamilla Rakhimova 7–6(7–5), 4–6, [10–4]

Singles main draw entrants

Seeds

1 Rankings are as of 12 July 2021.

Other entrants
The following players received wildcards into the main draw:
  Nuria Brancaccio 
  Lucia Bronzetti
  Lucrezia Stefanini
  Zhang Shuai

The following player received entry using a protected ranking:
  Alexandra Dulgheru
  Mandy Minella

The following players received entry from the qualifying draw:
  Marina Bassols Ribera
  Katharina Gerlach
  Elena-Gabriela Ruse
  Zheng Qinwen

Withdrawals 
Before the tournament
  Sorana Cîrstea → replaced by  Leonie Küng
  Elisabetta Cocciaretto → replaced by  Grace Min
  Sara Errani → replaced by  Lara Arruabarrena
  Viktorija Golubic → replaced by  Francesca Di Lorenzo
  Ana Konjuh → replaced by  Alexandra Dulgheru
  Jasmine Paolini → replaced by  Jaqueline Cristian
  Bernarda Pera → replaced by  Olga Danilović
  Andrea Petkovic → replaced by  Valeria Savinykh
  Arantxa Rus → replaced by  Natalia Vikhlyantseva
  Patricia Maria Țig → replaced by  Cristina Bucșa
  Martina Trevisan → replaced by  Giulia Gatto-Monticone
  Renata Zarazúa → replaced by  Vitalia Diatchenko
During the tournament
  Jil Teichmann

Doubles main draw entrants

Seeds

1 Rankings are as of July 12, 2021.

Other entrants
The following pairs received wildcards into the doubles main draw:
  Matilde Paoletti /  Lisa Pigato
  Camilla Rosatello /  Dalila Spiteri

Withdrawals
Before the tournament
  Lizette Cabrera /  Maddison Inglis → replaced by  Sarah Beth Grey /  Emily Webley-Smith
  Dalma Gálfi /  Samantha Murray Sharan → replaced by  Maddison Inglis /  Samantha Murray Sharan
  Beatrice Gumulya /  Hsieh Yu-chieh → replaced by  Lara Arruabarrena /  Beatrice Gumulya

References

External links 
 Official website 

Internazionali Femminili di Palermo
Internazionali Femminili di Palermo
2021 in Italian women's sport
Internazionali Femminili di Palermo
2021 in Italian tennis